"Two Concepts of Liberty" was the inaugural lecture delivered by the liberal philosopher Isaiah Berlin before the University of Oxford on 31 October 1958. It was subsequently published as a 57-page pamphlet by Oxford at the Clarendon Press. It also appears in the collection of Berlin's papers entitled Four Essays on Liberty (1969) and was more recently reissued in a collection entitled simply Liberty (2002).

The essay, with its analytical approach to the definition of political concepts, re-introduced the study of political philosophy to the methods of analytic philosophy. It is also one of Berlin's first expressions of his ethical ontology of value-pluralism. Berlin defined negative liberty (as the term "liberty" was used by Thomas Hobbes) as the absence of coercion or interference with agents' possible private actions, by an exterior social-body. He also defined it as a comparatively recent political ideal, which re-emerged in the late 17th century, after its slow and inarticulate birth in the Ancient doctrines of Antiphon the Sophist, the Cyrenaic discipleship, and of Otanes after the death of pseudo-Smerdis. In an introduction to the essay, Berlin writes: "As for Otanes, he wished neither to rule nor to be ruled—the exact opposite of Aristotle's notion of true civic liberty. ... [This ideal] remains isolated and, until Epicurus, undeveloped ... the notion had not explicitly emerged".

Summary 

Liberty (according to merriam-webster dictionary) refers to:

1: the quality or state of being free:
a: the power to do as one pleases
b: freedom from physical restraint
c: freedom from arbitrary or despotic (see DESPOT sense 1) control
d: the positive enjoyment of various social, political, or economic rights and privileges
e: the power of choice

Isaiah Berlin's positive and negative liberty can be thought of as "freedom to" and "freedom from". 

Negative liberty Berlin initially defined as freedom from, that is, the absence of constraints on the agent imposed by other people.
Positive liberty he defined both as freedom to, that is, the ability (not just the opportunity) to pursue and achieve willed goals; and also as autonomy or self-rule, as opposed to dependence on others.

Positive liberty 
"is involved in the answer to the question 'What, or who, is the source of control or interference that can determine someone to do, or be, this rather than that?'"

Positive liberty may be understood as self-mastery. Berlin granted that both concepts of liberty represent valid human ideals, and that both forms of liberty are necessary in any free and civilised society.

Negative liberty 
"liberty in the negative sense involves an answer to the question: 'What is the area within which the subject—a person or group of persons—is or should be left to do or be what he is able to do or be, without interference by other persons?'"

For Berlin, negative liberty represents a different, and sometimes contradictory, understanding of the concept of liberty, which needs to be carefully examined. Its later proponents (such as Tocqueville, Constant, Montesquieu, John Locke, David Hume and John Stuart Mill, who accepted Chrysippus' understanding of self-determination) insisted that constraint and discipline were the antithesis of liberty and so were (and are) less prone to confusing liberty and constraint in the manner of rationalists and the philosophical harbingers of totalitarianism. This concept of negative liberty, Berlin argued, constitutes an alternative, and sometimes even opposed, concept to positive liberty, and one often closer to the intuitive modern usage of the word.  Berlin considered negative liberty one of the distinguishing concepts of modern liberalism and observed
"The fathers of liberalism—Mill and Constant—want more than this minimum: they demand a maximum degree of non-interference compatible with the minimum demands of social life. It seems unlikely that this extreme demand for liberty has ever been made by any but a small minority of highly civilized and self-conscious human beings."

Suggestions that positive liberty is "abuse" in context 
Isaiah Berlin notes that historically positive liberty has proven particularly susceptible to rhetorical abuse; especially from the 18th century onwards, it has either been paternalistically re-drawn from the third-person, or conflated with the concept of negative liberty and thus disguised underlying value-conflicts.

Berlin contended that under the influence of Plato, Aristotle, Jean-Jacques Rousseau, Immanuel Kant, and G. W. F. Hegel, modern political thinkers often conflated positive liberty with rational action, based upon a rational knowledge to which, it is argued, only a certain elite or social group has access. This rationalist conflation was open to political abuses, which encroached on negative liberty, when such interpretations of positive liberty were, in the nineteenth century, used to defend nationalism, paternalism, social engineering, historicism, and collective rational control over human destiny. Berlin argued that, following this line of thought, demands for freedom paradoxically could become demands for forms of collective control and discipline—those deemed necessary for the "self-mastery" or "self-determination" of nations, classes, democratic communities, and even humanity as a whole. There is thus an elective affinity, for Berlin, between positive liberty, when it is rhetorically conflated with goals imposed from the third-person that the individual is told they "should" rationally desire, and the justifications for political totalitarianism, which contrary to value-pluralism, presupposed that values exist in Pythagorean harmony.

Dialectic of positive and negative liberty 
Berlin did not argue that the concept of positive liberty should be rejected—on the contrary, he recognised it as one human value among many, and one necessary to any free society. He argued that positive liberty was a genuine and valuable version of liberty, so long as it was identified with the autonomy of individuals, and not with the achievement of goals that individuals 'ought to' 'rationally' desire. Berlin argued, rather, that these differing concepts showed the plurality, and incompatibility of human values, and the need to analytically distinguish and trade-off between, rather than conflate, them.

Thus, Berlin offers in his "Two Concepts of Liberty" essay, "Where it is to be drawn is a matter of argument, indeed of haggling. Men are largely interdependent, and no man's activity is so completely private as never to obstruct the lives of others in any way. 'Freedom for the pike is death for the minnows'; the liberty of some must depend on the restraint of others. Freedom for an Oxford don, others have been known to add, is a very different thing from freedom for an Egyptian peasant."

Criticism

In contrast to Berlin, Charles Taylor argues that the Hobbes-Bentham view is indefensible as a view of freedom. Faced with this two-step process, it seems safer and easier to stop it at the first step, to insist firmly that freedom is just a matter of the absence of external obstacles, that it, therefore, involves no discrimination of motivation and permits in principle no second-guessing of the subject by anyone else. Taylor suggests that this is the essence of the Maginot Line strategy and it is very tempting, as a line of argument. But, claims it is wrong, we cannot defend a view of freedom that does not involve at least some qualitative discrimination as to motive, that is which does not put some restrictions on motivation among the necessary conditions for freedom, and hence which could rule out second-guessing in principle.

Taylor, therefore, argues for a distinction between negative and positive liberty that highlights the importance of social justice. Therefore, if social justice is a major part of equality, then liberty is not a synonym of lack of obstacles, but being able to grasp those obstacles, to discuss and work to overcome them.

Historian Bernard Bailyn contended that "Two Concepts of Liberty" was "formally cast as a discourse on the permissible limits of coercion; 'force' and 'constraint" are repeatedly referred to, and Berlin denied that all historical conflicts are reducible to conflicts of ideas." Berlin's "comments on the dangers of perfectionism had begun with his discussion of positive liberty...While at times, he then wrote, it might be justifiable 'to coerce men in the name of some goal (let us say, justice or public health), which they would, if they were more enlightened, themselves pursue,' once one claims that one knows what others need better than they know it themselves, one is 'in a position to ignore the actual wishes of men or societies.' " Bailyn triangulated his own approach with Berlin's "embattled position in defense of a liberal alternative" and the "perfectionist ideas" in governance that became Hannah Arendt's "totalitarianism". Bailyn decried "the repressive power of the Soviet state, the annihilatory power of the Nazi regime, the mind-blinding power of Maoist gangs, [and] the suffocating power of Islamic fundamentalism." He declared that "no one knew better than Berlin or expressed more brilliantly the genealogy and structure of perfectionist ideas. But their threat to civilisation, in the most general terms, lay not in their intrinsic malevolence but in the brutality of those who implacably imposed them: the populist thugs, the fanatical monopolists of power." Bailyn introduced his final collection of essays by asserting that "Isaiah Berlin was wrong in his entertaining game of classifying writers and thinkers into hedgehogs, who focus on one great theme, and foxes, who study and write about many themes and see the world through many lenses--wrong at least as far as historians are concerned. Many, like me, are both."

See also 
 Positive and negative rights

References

External links 
 "Two Concepts of Liberty"
 The Isaiah Berlin Virtual Library
 

1958 speeches
Books in political philosophy
Pamphlets
Human rights concepts
Clarendon Press books